Somasundara Bharathiar (27 July 1879 – 14 December 1959) was a Tamil researcher, writer, professor and lawyer. He participated in the Anti-Hindi agitations of Tamil Nadu. He also headed the movement for the abolition of untouchability in Madurai.

Early days
Satyananda Somasundaran is the birth name of Somasundara Bharathiar. Born to Subramaniya Nayakkar (Ettappa Pillai) -  Muthammal  on 27 July 1879 in Ettayapuram. He was a friend of Subramania Bharati, whose father worked with Somasudara Bharathi's father. Both Somasundaran and Subramaniyam went to a poetry competition. Both their poems were selected as best poems. Both were given the title Bharathi.

References

Tamil writers
1879 births
1959 deaths
Tamil poets
Writers in British India